David Graham is an American writer married to the artist Lee Shippey.  He has published six collections of poetry, as well as poetry and short stories in numerous literary magazines. Born and raised in Johnstown, New York, he has taught English at Ripon College in Ripon, Wisconsin since 1987, where he became full professor in 2001. In 1996 he served as poet in residence at The Frost Place in Franconia, NH.

Education
M. F. A. in English, University of Massachusetts Amherst MFA Program for Poets & Writers, 1980
B.A. Dartmouth College, 1975. Summa cum laude. Major: English Literature and Creative Writing

Books
The Honey of Earth. Terrapin Books, 2019.
Local News: Poetry About Small Towns. (Poetry anthology) Ed. David Graham & Tom Montag. MWPH Books, 2019.
David Graham: Greatest Hits 1975-2000 Pudding House Publications, 2001
Stutter Monk Flume Press, 2000
Doggedness Devil's Millhopper Press, c. 1989 but appeared 1991
Second Wind Texas Tech University Press, 1990.
Magic Shows Cleveland State University Poetry Center, 1986
Common Waters Flume Press, 1986
After Confession: Poetry as Autobiography (Co-edited with Kate Sontag) Graywolf Press, 2001

References

https://web.archive.org/web/20100527133635/http://www.ripon.edu/academics/faculty/profiles/graham_d.html

External links
Home page https://www.davidgrahampoet.com
Links to online essays by Graham https://www.davidgrahampoet.com/essays.html
Valparaiso Review issue featuring Graham's work

American male poets
American short story writers
Year of birth missing (living people)
University of Massachusetts Amherst MFA Program for Poets & Writers alumni
Living people
Ripon College (Wisconsin) faculty
Poets from Massachusetts
Poets from New York (state)
Poets from Wisconsin
American male short story writers